San Vicente Ferrer Church may refer to:
 San Vicente Ferrer Church (Calulut)
 San Vicente Ferrer Church (Dupax del Sur)
 San Vicente Ferrer Church (Leganes, Iloilo)
 San Vicente Ferrer Church (Sabtang)